The Elizavetpol uezd, also known as the Ganja uezd after 1918, was a county (uezd) of the Elizavetpol Governorate of the Russian Empire, and later of the Azerbaijan Democratic Republic and Azerbaijan SSR until its formal abolition in 1929. The area of the Elizavetpol uezd corresponds to the modern-day Gadabay, Shamkir, Dashkasan, Goygol, and Samukh districts of Azerbaijan.

Geography
The Elizavetpol uezd was located in the northern part of Elizavetpol Governorate, bordering the Tiflis Governorate to the north, the Kazakh uezd to the west, the Aresh uezd to the east and Jevanshir uezd to the south. The administrative center of the uezd was the city of Yelisavetpol (Ganja). 

The area of the county was 8,726 square verst and was divided into two parts: the northeastern lowlands steppes, irrigated by Kura River and its tributaries and southwestern mountainous part, watered by Kura's right bank tributaries. The lowland part was split by the Kura and Alazani rivers, the latter of which is not forested, less fertile and rarely used for farming. The mountainous part of the county stretched up to the mountain range adjacent to Lake Sevan. The highest peaks of uezd included Murovdag, (11,219 ft), Ginal-dag (11,057 ft), Gyamysh (12,263 ft), bordered Javanshir uezd of Elizavetpol Governorate and Novobayazet uezd of Erivan Governorate. The main rivers flowing down from these mountains into the lowland part of uezd and discharging into Kura were Kuruk-chay, Ganja-chay, Qoshqara-chay, Shamkhor-chay.

History
After establishment of Russian rule over the khanates of the South Caucasus and the implementation of administrative reforms, the territories of Ganja khanate were incorporated into the Tiflis Governorate of the Russian Empire. On 10 April 1840, the Elizavetpol uezd was established within Georgian-Imereti Governorate, and on 14 December 1846 it was incorporated into the newly created Tiflis Governorate. In 1868, the uezd was reestablished within the newly founded Elizavetpol Governorate with its capital in Elizavetpol (present-day Ganja). 

After establishment of the Azerbaijan Democratic Republic in 1918, the uezd was renamed to the Ganja uezd, then named back to the Elizavetpol uezd and then again to the Ganja uezd on 10 August 1918. On 22 April 1920, a part of Ganja uezd was established as the Shamkhor uezd within Azerbaijan. 

With the Red Army invasion of Azerbaijan and subsequent establishment of Soviet rule, the uezd was abolished on 8 April 1929 following an administrative reorganisation of the region.

Administrative divisions 
The subcounties (uchastoks) of the Elizavetpol uezd in 1912 were as follows:

Economy 
The population of the county was engaged primarily in agricultural farming, gardening, winemaking, corn and rice growing. Wine production in Azerbaijan was mostly seen in the city of Elizavetpol and German-populated town of Helenendorf where 450,000 canisters of wine were produced annually. In 1890, there were 107 factories and plants with a total number of workers at 2,136. There were two copper plants which produced 84% of the copper in Caucasus.

Demographics

Russian Empire Census 
The majority of the population indicated Tatar to be their mother tongue, with significant Armenian and Russian speaking minorities.

Kavkazskiy kalendar 
The statistics indicated Shia Muslims to be the plurality of the population of the district, with significant Armenian, Sunni Muslim, and Russian minorities:

Notes

References

Bibliography 

Geographic history of Azerbaijan
States and territories established in 1840
1929 disestablishments in the Soviet Union
Uezds of Elizavetpol Governorate
Uezds of the Soviet Union
States and territories disestablished in 1929